= Maxillipiidae =

Scientific classification
- Domain: Eukaryota
- Kingdom: Animalia
- Phylum: Arthropoda
- Class: Malacostraca
- Order: Amphipoda
- Superfamily: Maxillipioidea
- Family: Maxillipiidae

Family of crustaceans

Maxillipiidae is a family of crustaceans belonging to the order Amphipoda.

Genera:

- Maxillipides Ledoyer, 1984
- Maxillipius Ledoyer, 1973
